Cladophora vagabunda is a species of marine green algae in the family Cladophoraceae. It has a worldwide distribution.

References

External links 
 
 Cladophora vagabunda at AlgaeBase
 Cladophora vagabunda at global name index
 Cladophora vagabunda at the World Register of Marine Species (WoRMS)

Plants described in 1963
Cladophoraceae